Cameron Davidson is an American photographer from Alexandria, Virginia who has photographed on assignment for such publications as Nature Conservancy,Vanity Fair, National Geographic, Smithsonian, WIRED, Preservation, Departures, Smithsonian Air & Space, ESPN The Magazine, Forbes, Virginia Living, Money, Field and Stream, Washington Post and Outside."  <p>Cameron is also known for his corporate and advertising work for these companies: Discovery Communications, Danfoss, Dominion, Ducks Unlimited, Freddie Mac, General Motors, Jeep-Chrysler, KHA, Rocky Mountaineer, SBA, SEIU, Veterans Administration, Visit Alexandria, Virginia Tourism

Biography
Cameron's career in photography started with a National Geographic contract assignment in the Spring of 1980. He was awarded Environmental Issues award from Nature's Best magazine for his aerial photography of Mountain Top Removal in West Virginia. In 1973 his first photo was published by the Grass Lake News a newspaper in Grass Lake, Michigan. In October 2012 the United States Postal Service have issued a series of stamps focused on aerial and satellite landscapes Earthscapes, with one of the images an aerial of Blackwater Refuge on Maryland's Eastern Shore.

Publications
 Chesapeake: The Aerial Photography of Cameron Davidson text by David Fahrenthold
 Over Florida,Text by Mark Derr, Forward by Marjorie Stoneman Douglas
 Washington D.C.: Our Nation's Capital,Text by Edwards Park
 A Moment of Silence: Arlington National Cemetery text by Owens Andrews

References

Living people
1955 births
20th-century American photographers
21st-century American photographers
People from Miami